Popelín is a municipality and village in Jindřichův Hradec District in the South Bohemian Region of the Czech Republic. It has about 500 inhabitants.

Administrative parts
The village of Horní Olešná is an administrative part of Popelín.

References

Villages in Jindřichův Hradec District